In London may refer to:
 B.B. King in London, 1971
 In London (Ravi Shankar album), 1964
 In London (Johnny Logan album), 1979
 "In London (song)", a 1978 song by Johnny Logan from the In London album
 In London (Dewey Redman album), 1996
 In London (Yilin Zhong novel), 2018